Charles Mills Galloway (August 15, 1875 - September 3, 1954) of South Carolina was  general counsel to the Controller General of the United States.

Biography
He was appointed by Woodrow Wilson to serve on the United States Civil Service Commission on May 22, 1913. He took his oath of office on June 20, 1913, and served until September 7, 1919. He died on September 3, 1954, in Asheville, North Carolina.

References

1875 births
1954 deaths
Government lawyers
People from South Carolina